Doozer Productions, Inc. is the production company of Bill Lawrence, best known for making Scrubs. The company's name is taken from a variant of Lawrence's middle name, Van Duzer. They currently are under contract with Warner Bros. Television. Jeff Ingold, former head of comedy at NBC, serves as president. Randall Winston is the final head of the triumvirate, acting as a main producer on all Doozer series. Liza Katzer was promoted by Lawrence to the role of VP of development.

It was originally based at Touchstone Television, then it was shifted to NBC Studios in 2000 in order to develop their own comedy Scrubs, which came from a previous Touchstone pact, and it was reupped in 2003. After six years working at the studio, he moved back to ABC Studios in 2007, for a new overall deal, allowing projects to be developed on the air for the ABC network. After only four years working at ABC, he was moved to Warner Bros. Television, where they are working at the company ever since then, developing their own projects working for the studio.

Productions

Current
 Ted Lasso (with Ruby's Tuna Inc., Universal Television and Warner Bros. Television) (2020–present)
 Shrinking (with 3 Chance Productions, Corporate Mandate and Warner Bros. Television) (2023–present)

Upcoming
 Clone High (with ShadowMachine, Lord Miller Productions and MTV Entertainment Studios, revival of the original series) (2023)
 Bad Monkey (with Warner Bros. Television) (TBA)

In development
 Untitled Sarah Chalke/Bill Lawrence project (with Warner Bros. Television)

Former
 Scrubs (with ABC Studios) (2001–2010)
 Clone High (with Lord Miller Productions, Touchstone Television, Nelvana and MTV Animation) (2002–2003)
 Cougar Town (with Coquette Productions and ABC Studios) (2009–2015)
 Ground Floor with (Warner Horizon Television) (2013–2015)
 Surviving Jack (with Warner Bros. Television) (2014)
 Undateable (with Warner Bros. Television) (2014–2016)
 Rush Hour (with RatPac-Dune Entertainment, New Line Cinema and Warner Bros. Television) (2016)
 Life Sentence (with In Good Company, CBS Television Studios and Warner Bros. Television) (2018)
 Whiskey Cavalier (with Hemingson Entertainment and Warner Bros. Television) (2019)
 Head of the Class (with Warner Bros. Television) (2021)

References

1998 establishments in California
Television production companies of the United States
Film production companies of the United States
American companies established in 1998
Mass media companies established in 1998
Companies based in Beverly Hills, California